Tori Black Is Pretty Filthy is a 2009 American pornographic film directed by Mason.

Release 
The film was released on DVD on September 16, 2009. The DVD release came with several special features, including a behind-the-scenes featurette, slide show, and a trailer.

Cast

Awards and nominations

References

External links 
 
 
 

2000s pornographic films
AVN Award winners
2000s English-language films
2000s American films